Field Marshal John Campbell, 2nd Duke of Argyll, 1st Duke of Greenwich,  (10 October 1680 – 4 October 1743), styled Lord Lorne from 1680 to 1703, was a Scottish nobleman and senior commander in the British Army. He served on the continent in the Nine Years' War and fought at the Battle of Kaiserwerth during the War of the Spanish Succession. He went on to serve as a brigade commander during the later battles of the War of the Spanish Succession. Next he was given command of all British forces in Spain at the instigation of the Harley Ministry; after conducting a successful evacuation of the troops from Spain, he became Commander-in-Chief, Scotland. During the Jacobite Rebellion, he led the government army against the Jacobites led by the Earl of Mar at the Battle of Sheriffmuir. He went on to serve as Lord Steward and then Master-General of the Ordnance under the Walpole–Townshend Ministry.

Early life
Born at Ham House, he was the son of Archibald Campbell, 1st Duke of Argyll and Elizabeth Campbell (née Tollemache, daughter of Sir Lionel Tollemache, 3rd Baronet). His mother was a stepdaughter of John Maitland, Duke of Lauderdale, a dominant figure in Scotland during Charles II's reign. Five years after his birth, Campbell's grandfather Archibald Campbell, 9th Earl of Argyll led Argyll's Rising against the rule of James II of England and VII of Scotland for which he was executed in Edinburgh in June 1685. Campbell was privately tutored first by Walter Campbell of Dunloskin, then by John Anderson of Dumbarton and, finally, by Alexander Cunningham.

Early military career
He was commissioned, after his father had given William III some encouragement, as colonel of Lord Lorne's Regiment of Foot, a regiment entirely raised by the Argyll family, on 7 April 1694. Campbell served briefly on the European continent in the Nine Years' War before the regiment was disbanded in 1698. He also served under the Duke of Marlborough at the Battle of Kaiserwerth in April 1702 during the War of the Spanish Succession. He was appointed a Knight of the Order of the Thistle later that year.

Campbell succeeded his father as Duke of Argyll and Chief of Clan Campbell in 1703, and also became colonel of the 4th Troop of Horse Guards and a privy councillor. For the help he gave the Queen persuading the Parliament of Scotland to support the Act of Union, he was created Earl of Greenwich and Baron Chatham in 1705. He then returned to the continent and, having been promoted to major-general early in 1706, served as a brigade commander under Marlborough at the Battle of Ramillies in May 1706 and at the Siege of Ostend in June 1706. After being appointed colonel of Prince George of Denmark's Regiment in 1707, he went on to command a brigade at the Battle of Oudenarde in July 1708 and at the Siege of Lille in Autumn 1708. Promoted to lieutenant general in April 1709, he also took part in the Siege of Tournai in June 1709 and the Battle of Malplaquet in September 1709.

Appointed a Knight of the Order of the Garter in December 1710, Campbell was promoted to full general and given command of all British forces in Spain at the instigation of the Harley Ministry in January 1711. He replaced James Stanhope who had been forced to surrender at Brihuega the previous December. The Harley government was negotiating an agreement with France which would see Britain recognise Philip V of Spain, in exchange for being allowed to retain Gibraltar and Minorca.

After conducting a successful evacuation of the troops from Spain he became Commander-in-Chief, Scotland in 1712. By 1713, however, Campbell had become critical of the ministry, and he joined the Whig opposition in making speeches against the government's policy on the Malt Tax. In July 1714, during Queen Anne's last illness, Campbell gave his full support to the Hanoverian succession. He was rewarded with the colonelcy of the Royal Horse Guards in June 1715.

Jacobite uprising

During the Jacobite Rebellion, Campbell led the government army against the Jacobites led by the Earl of Mar at the Battle of Sheriffmuir in November 1715. The battle was indecisive but favoured the government strategically. He led the advance against the Jacobite capital of Perth, capturing it in December with little bloodshed, but was then replaced as commander by William Cadogan.

Later career
He arrived back in London early in March 1716, and at first stood high in the king's favour, but in a few months was stripped of his offices. This, however, did not deter him from the discharge of his parliamentary duties; he supported the bill for the impeachment of Bishop Atterbury, and lent his aid to his countrymen by opposing the bill for punishing the city of Edinburgh for the Porteous Riots. In the beginning of the year 1719 he was again admitted into favour, and in April was created Duke of Greenwich.

He went on to become Lord Steward of the Household in 1721 and then Master-General of the Ordnance in June 1725 under the Walpole–Townshend Ministry. He also became colonel of the Queen's Regiment of Horse in August 1726 and, having been appointed Governor of Portsmouth in November 1730, he was restored to the colonelcy of the Royal Horse Guards in August 1733.

In the 1720s he commissioned the architect James Gibbs to design a Palladian house at Sudbrook Park close to his birthplace at Ham House.

Promoted to field marshal on 31 January 1735, Campbell was stripped of his post as Master-General of the Ordnance and the colonelcy of the Royal Horse Guards for opposing the Government of Robert Walpole in 1740. However he was restored to his post as Master-General of the Ordnance in February 1741 and restored to his colonelcy a few days later. However, disapproving the measures of the new administration, and apparently disappointed at not being given the command of the army, he shortly resigned all his posts, and spent the rest of his life in privacy and retirement.

Campbell died at Sudbrook Park, Petersham on 4 October 1743 and was buried in Westminster Abbey; his grave is marked by a small lozenge stone to the north east of Henry VII's tomb. A large monument, designed by the French sculptor, Louis-François Roubiliac, was erected for him in the south transept and unveiled in 1749.

Argyll Street in London's West End is named after him.

Family

Campbell married first, Mary Brown, daughter of John Brown and Ursula Duncombe, in 1701: they separated soon after the marriage and she died in 1717 and was buried in Westminster Abbey. He married in 1717 secondly, Jane Warburton, daughter of Thomas Warburton and Anne Williams, sister of Hugh Warburton and maid of honour to Queen Anne; Jane died in 1767 and was buried with him in Westminster Abbey. He had four daughters who reached maturity: Caroline Townshend, 1st Baroness Greenwich, Lady Elizabeth Campbell, Lady Anne Campbell and Lady Mary Coke.

In popular culture
Campbell is played by James Robertson Justice in the 1953 film Rob Roy, the Highland Rogue. He is played by Andrew Keir in Michael Caton-Jones's Rob Roy.

References

Sources
 Hugill, J.A.C. No Peace Without Spain. Kensal Press, 1991.

External links

|-

|-

1680 births
1743 deaths
2nd Dragoon Guards (Queen's Bays) officers
British field marshals
British Life Guards officers
Buffs (Royal East Kent Regiment) officers
Diplomatic peers
2
Garter Knights appointed by Anne
Knights of the Thistle
Lord-Lieutenants of Surrey
Royal Horse Guards officers
British army commanders in the War of the Spanish Succession
People from Richmond, London
Burials at Westminster Abbey
People of the Jacobite rising of 1715
Ambassadors of Great Britain to Spain
Lords High Commissioner to the Parliament of Scotland
Members of the Parliament of Scotland 1702–1707
18th-century Scottish landowners
Argyll
Argyll
Greenwich
Peers of England created by Queen Anne